UFC Fight Night: Hermansson vs. Cannonier (also known as UFC Fight Night 160 or UFC on ESPN+ 18) was a mixed martial arts event produced by the Ultimate Fighting Championship that took place on September 28, 2019 at Royal Arena in Copenhagen, Denmark.

Background 
The event marked the promotion's first visit to Denmark.

A middleweight bout between Jack Hermansson and Jared Cannonier served as the event headliner.

Danny Henry was briefly linked to a featherweight bout with Mike Davis at the event. However, Henry pulled out of the bout for undisclosed reasons in mid-September. In turn, Davis was pulled from the card and is expected to be rescheduled for a future event.

Former UFC Welterweight Championship challenger Thiago Alves was scheduled to face Gunnar Nelson at the event. However, Alves pulled out of the fight in mid-September due to an undisclosed injury. He was replaced by Gilbert Burns.

A middleweight bout between Alessio Di Chirico and Peter Sobotta was scheduled for the event. However, Sobotta was forced out of the bout and was replaced by promotional newcomer Makhmud Muradov.

Results

Bonus awards 
The following fighters received $50,000 bonuses.
Fight of the Night: No bonus awarded.
Performance of the Night: Jared Cannonier, Ovince Saint Preux, John Phillips and Jack Shore

See also 

 List of UFC events
 2019 in UFC
 List of current UFC fighters

References 

UFC Fight Night
2019 in mixed martial arts
Mixed martial arts in Denmark
Sports competitions in Copenhagen
2019 in Danish sport
September 2019 sports events in Europe